Opolany is a municipality and village in Nymburk District in the Central Bohemian Region of the Czech Republic. It has about 900 inhabitants. It lies on the Cidlina River.

Administrative parts
Villages of Kanín, Opolánky and Oškobrh are administrative parts of Opolany.

Geography
It lies in a flat and mostly agricultural landscape in the Central Elbe Table. The Cidlina River flows through the municipality.

History
The first written mention of Opolany is from 1228, when it was listed as property of St. George's Convent in Prague. After the Hussite Wars, the village was annexed to the Poděbrady estate. From 1487 until the establishment of an independent municipality in 1850, it was part of the Kolín estate and shared its owners.

Transport
The D11 motorway (part of the European route E67) from Prague to Hradec Králové leads across the municipality.

The railway line Kolín–Trutnov passes through the municipal territory. Opolany is served by the station named Sány, located in Opolánky.

Sights
The landmark of Opolany is the Evangelical church. It was built in 1893.

References

External links

Villages in Nymburk District